Peter or Pete Brady may refer to:

People 
 Peter Brady (footballer) (1875–1949), Australian rules footballer for St Kilda
 Peter Brady (politician) (1829–?), American politician
 Ruairí Ó Brádaigh (1932–2013), Irish republican, born Peter Brady
 Peter J. Brady (born 1962), American labor leader and member of the Vermont House of Representatives
 Peter Rainsford Brady (1825–1902), American military officer, surveyor and politician
 Peter Brady, Irish politician defeated by Derek Keating
 Peter Brady, Canadian ice hockey player of the Powell River Kings
 Pete Brady, Canadian writer for Cannabis Culture
 Pete Brady (presenter) (born 1942), radio and TV presenter, of the TV series Magpie

Characters 
 Peter Brady (The Brady Bunch)
 Dr. Peter Brady, a The Invisible Man character
 Pete Brady, a Silver Street character